This article presents a list of the historical events and publications of Australian literature during 1983.

Events

 The judges of the 1983 Miles Franklin Award announced there was no book entered of sufficient merit to receive the award.

Major publications

Novels 
Brian Castro, Birds of Passage
 Elizabeth Jolley
Miss Peabody's Inheritance
Mr Scobie's Riddle
 Kylie Tennant, Tantavallon
 Morris West, The World Is Made of Glass

Short story anthologies 
 Beverley Farmer, Milk
 David Malouf, Antipodes

Children's and young adult fiction 
 Pamela Allen, Bertie and the Bear
 Mem Fox, Possum Magic
 Patricia Wrightson, A Little Fear

Poetry 
Les Murray
Flowering Eucalypt in Autumn
The People's Otherworld
John Tranter, Selected Poems

Drama 
 Stephen Sewell, The Blind Giant is Dancing

Non-fiction 
Russell Braddon
Japan Against the World
The Other Hundred Years War
Mary Durack, Sons in the Saddle
Sylvia Lawson, The Archibald Paradox
  Megan McMurchy, Margot Oliver and Jeni Thornley, For Love or Money, a Pictorial History of Women and Work in Australia
  Lilith Norman, The brown and yellow: Sydney Girls' High School 1883–1983
Cyril Pearl, The Dunera Scandal: Deported by Mistake
Lloyd Robson, A History of Tasmania (Volume 1)
Anne Summers, Gamble for Power: How Bob Hawke beat Malcolm Fraser: The 1983 federal election

Awards and honours

Member of the Order of Australia (AM)
 Joyce Nicholson, for "service to literature and the book publishing industry"
 Lu Rees, for "service to children's literature and the community"

Births 
A list, ordered by date of birth (and, if the date is either unspecified or repeated, ordered alphabetically by surname) of births in 1983 of Australian literary figures, authors of written works or literature-related individuals follows, including year of death.

 2 December — Tara June Winch, writer of Aboriginal and European descent

Deaths 
A list, ordered by date of death (and, if the date is either unspecified or repeated, ordered alphabetically by surname) of deaths in 1983 of Australian literary figures, authors of written works or literature-related individuals follows, including year of birth.
 20 January — Maie Casey, Baroness Casey, pioneer aviator, poet, librettist, biographer, memoirist and artist (born 1892)
 23 January — Lu Rees, bookseller, book collector and children's literature advocate (born 1901)
 8 February – Colin Simpson, journalist and travel writer (born 1908)
 31 March — Christina Stead, novelist and short-story writer (born 1902)
 25 August — Donald Stuart, novelist whose works include stories with Aboriginal backgrounds and a series recounting his experience as a prisoner of war in Burma in World War II (born 1913)
 29 September — Alan Moorehead, war correspondent and author of popular histories (born 1910)
 5 December — Gavin Greenlees, poet (born 1930)

See also 
 1983 in Australia
 1983 in literature
 1983 in poetry
 List of years in literature
 List of years in Australian literature

References

1983 in Australia
Australian literature by year
20th-century Australian literature
1983 in literature